2016 LAF season is the first edition of the League of American Football, the national tournament of Russia In American football.

Format 
26 clubs from 18 cities were participating in five regional divisions.

Teams

External links
Season statistics on the official website of the Federation of Americal Football in Russia

2016